Alex Chiasson (born October 1, 1990) is a Canadian professional ice hockey forward currently playing for the Detroit Red Wings of the National Hockey League (NHL). He has previously played in the NHL for the Dallas Stars, Ottawa Senators, Calgary Flames, Washington Capitals, Edmonton Oilers and Vancouver Canucks. Chiasson won the Stanley Cup as a member of the Capitals in 2018.

Playing career

Early life
Born in Montreal, and raised in Saint-Augustin-de-Desmaures, Chiasson grew up cheering for the Montreal Canadiens. He began skating at age 4 after his sister suggested that he start. He played in the 2003 and 2004 Quebec International Pee-Wee Hockey Tournaments with a minor ice hockey team from Rive-Nord, Montreal.

After his sophomore year of high school, he left Quebec to study at Northwood School in Lake Placid, New York. Although Chiasson did not speak English until he moved to the United States (famously knowing only the words "yes", "no", and "toaster", hence his nickname of "Toaster"), he has since become fluent.

Amateur
Chiasson played for the Des Moines Buccaneers of the USHL for the 2008–09 season. While in Des Moines he was coached by J. P. Parisé. That year he led the team in scoring and was selected for the 2009 USHL All-Star Game. He was drafted in the 2009 NHL Entry Draft by the Dallas Stars in the second round (thirty eighth overall).

Boston University
In 2009 Chiasson enrolled at Boston University, then the defending NCAA Division I Ice Hockey National Champions. He has remarked that he enjoyed playing for BU in part due to the close knit nature of the team. In his first season at BU he missed several games due to a concussion.

During the 2010 off season Chiasson worked out with Patrice Bergeron in Quebec. He was successful in the 2010–11 season, and led his team in scoring. While not playing hockey, Chiasson enjoys golfing and attending Boston Red Sox games. His teammates nicknamed him "chaser".

Professional

Dallas Stars
On March 26, 2012, Chiasson signed a three-year contract with the Dallas Stars organization. He was assigned to their AHL affiliate, the Texas Stars, where he finished the rest of the season.

During the lock-out-shortened 2012–13 season, Chiasson was recalled from Texas and made his NHL debut on April 3, 2013 against the Anaheim Ducks.  In his second career game Chiasson scored his first NHL goal on April 5, 2013 against Viktor Fasth of the Anaheim Ducks. Playing in the first line along with Jamie Benn and Ray Whitney, Chiasson scored six goals in his first six games.

Ottawa Senators
Chiasson was involved in a blockbuster trade on July 1, 2014, being dealt to the Ottawa Senators along with Alex Guptill, Nick Paul, and a 2015 second round pick in exchange for star forward Jason Spezza, and Ludwig Karlsson. He scored a goal in his first game with the Senators on October 9, 2014.

Following the 2014–15 NHL season Chiasson became a restricted free agent under the NHL Collective Bargaining Agreement. The Ottawa Senators made him a qualifying offer to retain his NHL rights and, on July 5, 2015, Chiasson filed for salary arbitration. Chiasson was seeking $2.4 million per year, while the Senators offered $1 million. The arbitrator awarded Chiasson a one-year contract of $1.2 million.

Calgary Flames
Following the 2015–16 season, Ottawa and Chiasson again clashed over a new contract, unable to agree to a dollar value. As such, the Senators traded Chiasson to the Calgary Flames in exchange for Patrick Sieloff on June 27, 2016. He was promptly signed as a restricted free agent to a one-year $800,000 contract with the Flames. He rebounded offensively with the Flames in the 2016–17 season, providing depth scoring with 12 goals and 24 points in 81 games. As an arbitration eligible restricted free agent following a first-round exit in the post-season, Chiasson was not extended a qualifying offer by the deadline on June 26, 2017.

Washington Capitals
On September 9, 2017, the Washington Capitals signed Chiasson, then an unrestricted free agent, to a professional tryout (PTO). Following training camp and preseason, on October 4, 2017, the Capitals signed Chiasson to a $660,000 one-year contract. Chiasson won his first Stanley Cup in 2018 with the Capitals.

Edmonton Oilers
On September 10, 2018, Chiasson signed a professional try out contract with the Edmonton Oilers, and on October 2, signed a one-year contract with the Oilers. With the Oilers, Chiasson set a new career high for most goals in a season, scoring his 14th on December 14, 2018, against Anthony Stolarz of the Philadelphia Flyers in a 4–1 victory.

On April 26, 2021, Chiasson scored his 100th career goal in the NHL, opening the scoring in a 6–1 victory over the Winnipeg Jets.

Vancouver Canucks
On October 12, 2021, Chiasson signed a one-year, $750,000 contract with the Vancouver Canucks after a successful try-out in training camp. In the  season, Chiasson played in a depth forward role with the Canucks, featuring in 67 regular season games for 13 goals and 22 points.

Detroit Red Wings
As a free agent from the Canucks, Chiasson for the second consecutive season went un-signed over the summer before accepting a professional try-out to attend the Arizona Coyotes training camp for the  season. Following the Coyotes pre-season, Chiasson was unable to secure a contract and was released from his PTO on October 10, 2022. Remaining without a club for the first quarter of the season, Chiasson agreed to join the Detroit Red Wings affiliate AHL team, the Grand Rapids Griffins, on a professional tryout on November 26, 2022. Chiasson would add 20 points through 29 games with the Griffins before he was signed to a one-year, two-way contract with the Red Wings for the remainder of the season on March 3, 2023.

Career statistics

Awards and honours

References

External links

1990 births
Living people
Boston University Terriers men's ice hockey players
Calgary Flames players
Canadian expatriate ice hockey players in the United States
Canadian ice hockey right wingers
Dallas Stars draft picks
Dallas Stars players
Des Moines Buccaneers players
Detroit Red Wings players
Edmonton Oilers players
Grand Rapids Griffins players
Ottawa Senators players
People from Capitale-Nationale
Ice hockey people from Montreal
Stanley Cup champions
Texas Stars players
Vancouver Canucks players
Washington Capitals players